Kappa Phi Lambda Sorority, Inc. ( also known as Kappas and KPL) is a nonprofit, Asian-interest sorority that was founded in 1995 at Binghamton University in Binghamton, New York. The sorority is represented at 34 schools with over 4,000 members nationally. It is a member of the National APIDA Panhellenic Association (NAPA).

History
Seven women came together to establish Kappa Phi Lambda Sorority, Inc. at Binghamton University on March 9, 1995. The seven founders were Elizabeth Choi, Karen Eng, Rei Hirasawa, Hee Cho Moon, Chae Yoo Park, Samantha Somchanhmavong, and Connie Yang. 

The sorority was conceived through the notion of an organization that would provide a culturally sound and educationally inspiring grounding for Asian-American women. These women saw there was a need for an organization of this kind that would give inspiration and education to their community.

This sorority is open to women of all nationalities and backgrounds who want to learn about, actively speak for, and represent Pan-Asian culture.

Philanthropy 
Kappa Phi Lambda has selected CARE, a leading humanitarian organization fighting global poverty, as its national philanthropy.

Chapters 
There are currently 25 active chapters and nine associate chapters of Kappa Phi Lambda. Active chapters are indicated in bold. Inactive chapters are indicated in italic.

Notes

See also 
Cultural interest fraternities and sororities

References

Fraternities and sororities in the United States
Student societies in the United States
Asian-American fraternities and sororities
Asian-American culture in New York (state)
Student organizations established in 1995
1995 establishments in New York (state)